Ana María Garrido Ramos (born  1966) is a former local government employee of the Ayuntamiento of Boadilla del Monte in the Madrid metropolitan area. She is a key witness and whistleblower in the Gürtel case, an ongoing political corruption scandal in Spain.

In 1993, Garrido Ramos started employment with the Ayuntamiento de Boadilla, working in the youth section. She became its head in 2007. In March 2008, Mayor Arturo González Panero chose to stand down after a period of illness and went to stay in Costa Rica.  González Panero was later named in the Panama Papers.

An internal company document suggested that he acted beyond his remit both geographically and in political and business dealings. Even though Garrido Ramos had knowledge of the entire contents of the document, she decided not to blow the whistle, fearing reprisals, and continued to work for the Ayuntamiento de Boadilla.

The 2011 indictment by examining magistrate Baltasar Garzón precipitated González Panero's resignation as mayor. In 2011 elections a new mayor, Antonio González Terol, took charge. González Panero returned to his managerial post as leader of the Youth Section until, in 2013, he was accused of workplace harassment.

Garrido Ramos developed clinical depression due to her treatment at work. Due to an appeal by Boadilla town hall, she has not received the sum as of September 2016.

Garrido Ramos has advocated a law to improve whistleblower protection. Her case has been closed. As of May 2016, she had sold most of her clothes and furniture, rented out her home, and was selling handmade bracelets for a living.

In 2016, she was nominated for the "Encina de Oro" Award.

References

External links
  Facebook page

Year of birth missing (living people)
Living people
Anti-corruption activists
People from Madrid